Barpeta Road or Athiyabari as known earlier is a town and Commercial City of Assam a municipal board in Barpeta district in the state of Assam, India.

Geography

Demography 
Barpeta Road is a Municipal Board city situated in Barnagar circle of Barpeta district. The Barpeta Road city is divided into 10 wards for which elections are held every 5 years. As per the Population Census 2011, there are total 7,484 families residing in the Barpeta Road city. The total population of Barpeta Road is 35,571 out of which 18,489 are males and 17,082 are females thus the Average Sex Ratio of Barpeta Road is 924.

The population of Children of age 0–6 years in Barpeta Road city is 3213 which is 9% of the total population. There are 1675 male children and 1538 female children between the age 0–6 years. Thus as per the Census 2011 the Child Sex Ratio of Barpeta Road is 918 which is less than Average Sex Ratio (924).

As per the Census 2011, the literacy rate of Barpeta Road is 87.2%. Thus Barpeta Road has higher literacy rate compared to 63.8% of Barpeta district. The male literacy rate is 91.52% and the female literacy rate is 82.58% in Barpeta Road.

Places of attraction

Declared as a national park in 1990, Manas National Park is located at Himalayan foothills where its having a unique biodiversity and scenic landscapes. It is one of the first reserves included in the tiger reserve network under project tiger in 1973. Covering an area of 2837 km2. Manas river flows through the park with unique blending of dense jungles and grass-land, harbours the largest number of protected species of India including tiger, leopard, civet, elephants, buffalo, pygmy hog, golden langur, Assam roof turtle, and the Bengal florican.

This park is included as a site of international importance under UNESCO's world heritage convention in 1988 as well as Biosphere Reserve in 1989. There are as many as 60 species of mammals, 312 birds, 42 reptiles, 7 amphibians, 54 fishes and more than 100 species of insects. The park has the unique feature of having most number of endangered species found in India. The place can be reached by road from Barpeta Road (20 km) connecting National highway No-31 that connects rest of India. The forest lodges are situated inside the park at Mathanguri which lies at a distance of 40 km from Barpeta Road. Visitors are to obtain necessary permission for entry into park at the office of Field Director Manas Tiger Reserve, Barpeta Road. The best time to visit the park is from November to April.

Sports
Barpeta Road is a very active town when it comes to sports. It has given birth to several sports persons representing the state. The natives are very good with football. The youths are more drawn towards taekwondo (a Korean martial art). There is a stadium named Barpeta Road Stadium for playing. Moreover, various intercity events are held by St Joseph's High School, St Mary's High School, Marian School and G.N. Bordoloi Memorial high School encouraging sports among the masses.

Transport
The town lies beside National Highway 27. The town is at a distance of 135 kilometers by road from Guwahati, the largest city in the region. By railway, the distance is 113 kilometers, covered in two to three hours. The nearest airport is Gauhati Airport, which is at a distance of 135 kilometers. The town is well connected through regular buses and trains to all the part of the country.

Direct train service connects the town to Trivandrum, Ernakulam, Bangalore, Chennai (In the South India) Mumbai, Barmer, Jodhpur, Bikaner (In the West India), New Delhi, Kanpur, Lucknow (In the Central India) and Kolkata, Puri, Dibrugarh (In the East India). The town is at a distance of 21 kilometers from the district headquarter of Barpeta district. The town is the gateway to Manas National Park. The town is one of the most important place of Western Assam and is an ideal place for trade and commerce. The town is referred to be the commercial capital of Western Assam.

IT HUB
Barpeta Road has become main gateway of Information Technology market. At least 20+ Software companies are operating from this town. [] . Indilens Web Solutions is one of the pioneer Software company in Barpeta Road.

References

 
Cities and towns in Barpeta district
Barpeta district
Lower Assam